This is a list of '''IUP Crimson Hawks football players in the NFL Draft.

Key

Selections
Source:

References

Lists of National Football League draftees by college football team

IUP Crimson Hawks NFL Draft